Anders Holmberg (born 4 September 1984) is a Swedish orienteering competitor. He won a silver medal in the sprint at the 2011 World Orienteering Championships Chambéry.

At the 2002 Junior World Orienteering Championships he placed fifth in the long distance and third with the Swedish relay team.

References

External links
 
 

1984 births
Living people
Swedish orienteers
Foot orienteers
Male orienteers
World Orienteering Championships medalists
21st-century Swedish people
Junior World Orienteering Championships medalists